Konstantin Kostadinov (born 25 March 2003) is a Bulgarian professional basketball player for Zunder Palencia of the LEB Oro on loan from Lenovo Tenerife. He plays on the small forward and power forward positions.

Early life and youth career
Kostadinov began playing basketball at BC Delfin Burgas. In June 2016, he was signed by Real Madrid to play for their youth ranks.

Kostadinov became the MVP of the 2017 Copa del Rey Junior averaging 15.4 points, 9.6 rebounds and 21.6 PIR per game.

In 2021, he won the Euroleague Basketball Next Generation Tournament with Real Madrid, recording a double-double of 18 points and 12 rebounds in the championship game against Barcelona.

Professional career
On 6 August 2021, Kostadinov signed with Palmer Alma Mediterrànea Palma of the Spanish second division, the LEB Oro. On 3 March 2022, he scored career-high 31 points, adding 10 rebounds and 2 assists in a 98–90 win against Força Lleida.

On 4 August 2022, Kostadinov signed a multi-year contract with Lenovo Tenerife of the Liga ACB and was immediately loaned to Zunder Palencia of the LEB Oro for the 2022–23 season.

National team career
Kostadinov helped Bulgaria U16 finish 6th in the 2019 FIBA U16 European Championship Division B, averaging 9.8 PPG, 4.9 RPG and 1.1 APG. On 22 February 2021, he made his debut for the senior team in a EuroBasket 2022 qualification game against Bosnia and Herzegovina, becoming the youngest ever debutant for the team at 17 years, 10 months and 28 days of age. He scored 11 points in a 61–80 loss.

References

External links
Player profile at feb.es
Player profile at euroleaguebasketball.net

2003 births
Living people
Power forwards (basketball)
Small forwards
Bulgarian men's basketball players